Vlad Georgescu (October 20, 1937–November 13, 1988), was a Romanian historian and the director of the Romanian-language department of Radio Free Europe between 1983 and 1988.

Biography

Born in Bucharest, Georgescu studied history at the University of Bucharest, and worked at the Romanian-Russian Museum until it was closed down in 1963, when he was transferred to the Institute of Southeastern European Studies in Bucharest.

He got a PhD in history from the University of Bucharest in 1970 and published works on 18th and 19th century Romanian history. Georgescu taught in 1967 and 1968 at the University of California, Los Angeles and in 1973 at Columbia University.

In 1977, Georgescu was jailed for two months for disputing the role of the Communist Party in history in the manuscript of a book which he had sent abroad. Two years later he left the country, becoming a fellow at the Woodrow Wilson International Center for Scholars in Washington, D.C. and teaching at the University of Maryland and at Rutgers University. Georgescu then returned to Europe and worked for the Radio Free Europe.

In 1987, a week after Georgescu announced that he would broadcast fragments from Ion Mihai Pacepa's Red Horizons, he received a warning from a Securitate general that he would not live more than a year if he went on to broadcast it. Georgescu ignored the warning and went ahead and broadcast it.

A year after that, he died of a brain tumor at the age of 51. In 2007, Cotidianul published informative notes sent by Constantin Bălăceanu-Stolnici to the Securitate, which included a sketch of Georgescu's Munich apartment, drawn after a visit to his place, which might have helped in his possible assassination.

He was married to Mary, with whom he had a son, Tudor.

Bibliography

Din corespondenţa diplomatică a Ţării Romîneşti, Muzeul Romîno-Rus, București, 1962, 268 p.
Political Ideas and the Enlightenment in the Romanian Principalities (1750–1831), Boulder (East European Quarterly), New York (Columbia University Press), 1971
Ideile politice şi iluminismul în principatele române (1750–1831), Editura Academiei RSR, București, 1972
Politică şi istorie: cazul comuniştilor români 1944–1977, editura Jon Dumitru (colecţia Clio fără mască), München, 1981 (reprinted in Romania after 1990 by Editura Humanitas), 158 p.
Istoria românilor de la origini pînă în zilele noastre, München, 1984, 394 p. (ed. a III-a, Editura Humanitas, București, 1992)
Istoria ideilor politice româneşti, editura Jon Dumitru (colecţia Clio fără mască), München, 1987
Romania anilor '80, editura Jon Dumitru (colecţia Clio fără mască), München, 1994, 254 p.

References

1937 births
1988 deaths
Writers from Bucharest
Romanian dissidents
20th-century Romanian historians
Romanian journalists
Radio Free Europe/Radio Liberty people
University of Bucharest alumni
Romanian anti-communists
20th-century journalists